Bishop Herman College, sometimes abbreviated to BIHECO, is a boys-only second-cycle institution located at Kpando in the Volta Region of Ghana.

History
Bishop Herman College was the first Catholic boys secondary school established by the Roman Catholic Church in the Volta Region of Ghana. The college was founded by Dutch missionaries and it is one of the best performing senior high schools in Ghana. It is named after French missionary, Bishop Augustine Herman, who served in the Keta Diocese from 1923 to 1945. The school is under the administration of the archdiocese of Ho, and its motto is "Sicut Miles Christi" ("As Soldiers of Christ"). The nickname for the college is BIHECO, and the students are called BIHECans and alumni are called BHOBUs

It was established on 28 February 1952. It was the first secondary school established by the Catholic Church in the Volta Region. The school was named after a French Catholic bishop, Auguste Herman.

Achievements
Bishop Herman stand as the best performing school in the Volta Region according WAEC rankings and their passion for science led them to win the maiden edition of the National Robotics Competition and two subsequent competitions.

Student body
The population of the school is roughly 2000. Day students account for less than 2% of enrollment. Bishop Herman College is known for its general arts, business and science programs. The college continues to educate Ghana's elite, and has a para-Air force cadet program which prepares students to enroll in the Military Officers Academy. Many students follow family tradition by enrolling at the school. Admission is highly competitive, perhaps the boys' institution with most annual applications.

The students are among the highest performing in the WAEC exams. There is a rivalry with Kpando Technical Institute in Kpando and Pope John's Senior High School in Koforidua. Ola Girls Senior High School is considered the sister school as it is also Catholic.

Houses
The college has seven houses providing room and board, named after Catholic Saints and Old Boys.  St. Augustine's House is named after Augustine of Hippo and is the oldest of the houses.

This house sits at the entrance of the school and has two entrances.

St. Cyprain's House is on the second floor of the same building as St. Benedict's House.

St. Maurice's House is on the first floor of the same building as Etu-Mantey houses.

St. Patrick's House, named after St. Patrick, is adjacent the college's hockey pitch.

Bishop Lodonu's House (the latest) was named after an alumnus, Bishop Francis Anane K. Lodonu.

See also

 Education in Ghana
 List of schools in Ghana

References 

1952 establishments in Gold Coast (British colony)
Boys' schools in Ghana
Educational institutions established in 1952
High schools in Ghana
Catholic secondary schools in Ghana
Education in Volta Region